The men's singles competition in figure skating at the 2022 Winter Olympics was held on 8 February (short program) and 10 February (free skating), at the Capital Indoor Stadium in Haidian District of Beijing. Nathan Chen of the United States won the event, with Yuma Kagiyama of Japan taking the silver medal, and Shoma Uno, also of Japan, winning the bronze. For Chen and Kagiyama, these were their first individual Olympic medals; it was Uno's second following his silver in 2018.

Summary
The 2014 and 2018 Olympic champion Yuzuru Hanyu and the 2018 silver medalist Shoma Uno qualified for the Olympics, whereas the bronze medalist, Javier Fernández, retired from competition in 2019. Nathan Chen, the 2021 World champion, had the highest score in the 2021–22 season prior to the Olympics. Vincent Zhou had the second-highest score in the season, and Uno the third-highest. Hanyu missed much of the season due to injury, competing only at the 2021–22 Japan Championships. Hanyu and Chen were predicted to be the main Olympic gold contenders, with Uno, Zhou, and Yuma Kagiyama named as medal contenders. Zhou withdrew prior to the short program due to a positive COVID-19 test.

In the short program, Hanyu missed his opening jump, a quadruple Salchow, and placed eighth in the segment. Chen set a new world record to win the segment nearly six points ahead of Yuma Kagiyama and eight points ahead of Uno. Hanyu was third in the free skating to move up to fourth overall, surpassing Cha Jun-hwan who finished in fifth. The top three from the short program retained their positions, with Chen also winning the free skating to capture the Olympic title by over 22 points ahead of Kagiyama and nearly 40 points ahead of Uno.

Records

Prior to the competition, the existing ISU best scores were:

The following new best score was set during this competition:

Qualification

Schedule
All times are (UTC+8).

Results

Short program
The short program was held on 8 February 2022.

The top 24 skaters at the end of the short program advanced to the free skating.

Free skating
The free skating was held on 10 February 2022.

Overall
The skaters were ranked according to their overall score.

References

Figure skating at the 2022 Winter Olympics
Men's events at the 2022 Winter Olympics